Nasser Azam (born 1963, in Jhelum, Pakistan) is a British contemporary artist, living and working in London.

Biography
Nasser Azam was born in Jhelum, Pakistan in 1963, and moved to London with his parents when he was 7 years old (1970). He began painting in 1980, and in the same year embarked on a business degree at the University of Birmingham. In 1983 he also featured in a BBC documentary.

In 2007, after an extended period living and travelling in Japan, America and Europe, Azam became Artist-in-Residence at the County Hall Gallery, with an exhibition of early and recent work. Subsequent exhibitions included the 'Anatomica' series of paintings, made from illustrations taken both from fashion magazines and medical textbooks. In 2012 Azam unveiled "Athena" at Silvertown in the London Borough of Newham, London city airport. At just over twelve metres high, it is the tallest bronze sculpture in the United Kingdom. Previous sculptural work includes the large bronze sculpture The Dance, unveiled on the South Bank on 21 February 2008 and work for the National Botanic Gardens of Ireland, in Dublin.

Azam's semi-abstract style of painting has been compared with that of Willem de Kooning. His paintings show the human figure encoded in bio-morphic forms and gestural marks, and typically use a restricted palette.

In 2010 Azam purchased the Morris Singer Art Foundry and relaunched it as the Zahra Modern Art Foundry.

'Performance Painting' Project 2008–10

Many of Azam's works during the period 2008 to 2010 were made as part of the 'performance painting' project. His purpose was to find the most extreme conditions in which to make paintings, and to use a work of art to document the moment and location in which it was made. In July 2008 Azam completed a project he called Life in Space aboard a specially modified ILYUSHIN 76 MDK parabolic aircraft, where he completed two triptychs, Homage to Francis Bacon: Triptych I and Homage to Francis Bacon: Triptych II while the aircraft created weightless conditions similar to those in space. Azam's 'Life in Space' series of paintings was exhibited in London in Spring 2009.

In February 2010 Azam conducted an artistic expedition to Antarctica, where he produced 13 large abstract oil paintings responding to different Antarctic landscapes, including ice lakes, ice caves, glaciers and ice deserts. Azam prepared for the Antarctica trip with a series of artistic trials in the freezers at Billingsgate Fish Market. The expedition was accompanied by a cameraman to document the mission.

Art Below
In April 2011, Azam, with Art Below, carried out a dual public art display in the Tokyo Metro and London Underground commuters saw a scene of Antarctica and one artist – a dot in the huge icy canvas. In July 2008 Azam completed two triptychs in zero gravity, done as a homage to the artist Francis Bacon. In February 2010, accompanied by a camera crew, Azam to draw inspiration from the frozen tundra of Antarctica where he endured extreme weather conditions to produce a series of large abstract oil paintings. For 2 weeks, Azam's work was on the billboard space of 2 platforms 6000 miles apart in Tokyo's Shibuya station and London's Liverpool Street Station with images of his Antarctica series. Azam commented "I wanted to expose the desolate, silent, spacious and empty environment of the South Pole in probably the most crowded, hectic, busy and noisy space in the world" Accompanying the poster display on the Liverpool Street station platform, Art Below took over a 3-metre wide digital projection screen, piloting an international video link enabling London's travellers to view the Tokyo platform – the poster display and all the public activity going on around it. Playing on the same video loop was a 2-minute film made in collaboration with Bafta nominated British Film Director Ed Blum. Here we see Nasser Azam creating canvasses at temperatures of minus 40 degrees and buffeted by gales, he paints in different settings: on glaciers, by frozen lakes, in ice caves. Nasser says "I am confronted by a magnitude of blinding light, by wind and intense cold." Some of his canvases were lost in an Antarctic gale.  But most are here for us to see. Such ordeals need preparation.  Azam prepared for this venture in the huge freezer of Billingsgate Butchers Market, devising brushes that would work in such temperatures, and acrylic paint that did not clog. Art Below made the policy decision to persist with this display in Tokyo despite tsunami, earthquake and nuclear fallout. Ben Moore said, "We did this in the sure conviction that Tokyo's commuters will appreciate such a diversion from their adversities. Now is not the time to withdraw our custom." This was the third exhibition they have staged in the Tokyo metro.

Official Portrait of Malala Yousafzai 

In 2015, Nasser Azam painted the official portrait of Malala Yousafzai, an activist for female education and the youngest-ever Nobel Prize laureate. Standing three metres high, the portrait indicates the enormous impact Yousafzai has had on the world.
Malala first attracted public attention through her anonymous diary published on BBC website, detailing life under Taliban occupation in Pakistan, and their attempts to ban education for girls. In 2012, Malala narrowly avoided death after being shot by the Pakistani Taliban militants for her outspoken campaigning. After numerous interventions and intensive rehabilitation at the Queen Elizabeth Hospital in Birmingham, United Kingdom Malala has made a full recovery and continued her mission for the right of all children to education. The assassination attempt sparked a worldwide outburst, and Yousafzai's advocacy has since grown into an international movement. 
After seeing Azam's monumental portrait for the first time, Malala stated: It's more than a painting to me, it's the support that Mr Azam gives to the education campaign that I stand for and that's why it means a lot to me. I am hopeful that we will achieve our goal, we will make sure every child goes to school.
The painting was donated to the University of Birmingham, digitally displayed at the new state-of-the-art library in Birmingham's city centre and added to London's National Portrait Gallery's public archive.

Solo exhibition Saiful Malook at the Saatchi Gallery, London

In 2019, London's prestigious Saatchi Gallery hosted Azam's largest and most comprehensive solo exhibition to date. The series of paintings was inspired by the artist's journey to the lake Saiful Malook, the secluded paradise near the mountains of Kashmir.
On his pilgrimage, the artist was accompanied by the British Indian musician Soumik Datta who composed music on the site of Azam's inspiration.
The lake became famous thanks to a poem by the Sufi saint and poet Mian Muhammad Bakhsh (1830 - 1907), which tells a story of a Prince of Persia who starts a restless journey to the lake in search of a fairy princess he saw in a dream. The poem was given a new lease of life in the early 1990s, when the qwaliyan Nusrat Fateh Ali Khan translated it into song and introduced it to the West.

Azam commented: What first intrigued me about the poem was discovering how it was inspired by the paradise-like settings of the majestic lake, Saiful Malook. On the surface, the poem can be interpreted as a fable, but when you peel back the layers - it’s a love story, and a story of humanity, passion, struggle and sacrifice.

Sited Sculptures

 As part of the nationwide Big Dance 2008 event the County Hall Gallery hosted an outdoor dance event on Sunday 6 July 2008. 'Sculpture in Motion' was a physical response to Azam's sculpture 'The Dance' on the South Bank.
 Azam's monumental bronze sculpture Sepian Blue was exhibited at Sculpture in Context, Ireland's largest exhibition of public sculpture held at the Botanic Gardens outside Dublin, and is now part of the Botanical Garden's permanent collection and displayed at the entrance to the gardens.
On 10 February 2010 Azam's monumental sculpture, The Dance was moved from the County Hall Gallery to an adjacent newly opened hotel, Park Plaza Westminster Bridge.
 On 5 July 2012 Azam's sculpture Athena was unveiled on the Connaught Bridge Road, Silvertown, London Borough of Newham. At just over twelve metres high, it is the tallest bronze sculpture in the United Kingdom. Athena was made at the Zahra Modern Art Foundries, Braintree, Essex.
 On 27 May 2012, Evolutionary Loop 517, a 6.25-metre bronze sculpture was unveiled alongside the Sir Duncan Rice Library, designed by schmidt hammer lassen architects, for the University of Aberdeen.

Projects
2008 Zero Gravity, a performance painting mission to complete two triptychs while aboard a parabolic aircraft creating weightless conditions, Star City, Moscow, Russia
Between 2007 and 2009 Azam was Artist-in-Residence at County Hall Gallery, London having a number of major solo exhibitions including:   
2009	Colour Over Form, The County Hall Gallery, London, UK
2009	Life in Space, The County Hall Gallery, London, UK
2008	Azam Painting and Sculpture, Istanbul, Turkey
2008	Paintings and Bronzes, County Hall Gallery, London, UK
2008	Anatomica, The County Hall Gallery, London, UK
2007	Azam Retrospective, The County Hall Gallery, London, UK
2010 Antarctica, a performance painting expedition to produce oil paintings responding to different Antarctic landscape
2011 Antarctica, a dual public display of Antarctica project in the Tokyo Metro and London Underground, UK and Japan
2011 Zahra Modern Art Foundries, purchase of the former Morris Singer Foundry, the oldest bronze foundry in the UK
2013/14 Commissions for Marea and Costata restaurants, New York City, USA
2015 Official portrait of Malala Yousafzai, unveiled at the Barber Institute of Fine Arts, Birmingham and displayed at the University of Birmingham. Also added to London's National Portrait Gallery's public archive, UK

Public appearances
 In October 2009 Azam participated in the debate 'Art: what's it good for?' chaired by Michael Portillo and part of the LCACE Inside Out Festival.
 In September 2009 Azam participated in Liliane Lijn's contemporary art performance piece Power Game at the Institute of Contemporary Arts, London.

Bibliography

The Independent on Sunday, Arts Review, Close-Up Nasser Azam, 4 January 2009

References

External links

BBC article and video of the Zero Gravity project
Guardian video footage of Nasser Azam in zero gravity
YouTube

Modern sculptors
British sculptors
British male sculptors
Pakistani emigrants to the United Kingdom
Naturalised citizens of the United Kingdom
People from Jhelum
Living people
1963 births
Artists from Lahore
Alumni of the University of Birmingham